Pervomaisk is a landlocked city in Mykolaiv Oblast, Ukraine and the administrative center of the Pervomaisk Raion. It is located on the Southern Bug river which bisects the city. Pervomaisk hosts the administration of Pervomaisk urban hromada, one of the hromadas of Ukraine. Population:  In 2001, population was 70,170.

The city is known for being a center (headquarters) of the Soviet Strategic Rocket Forces during the Soviet period.

Until 18 July 2020, Pervomaisk was incorporated as a city of oblast significance. It also served as the administrative center of Pervomaisk Raion even though it did not belong to the raion. In July 2020, as part of the administrative reform of Ukraine, which reduced the number of raions of Mykolaiv Oblast to four, the city of Pervomaisk was merged into Pervomaisk Raion.

Etymology
The name derives from the Russian pervomay (первомай) meaning "the first of May," (May Day). The city was formed in 1919 after the Bolshevik victory in the Ukrainian-Soviet war, as a result of the merger of three historic towns in the area.

The name for one of the merged towns, Bohopil (or Bohopol), was derived from the name of a local river Southern Bug which in Polish and Ukrainian is named Boh.

History
The city was formed in 1919 when three neighbouring settlements: the village of Holta (Голта) and the town of Bohopil (Богопіль) around a county city of Olviopol (Ольвіополь) were merged. These towns existed from 1773 and the first settlement in the area was mentioned as early as 1676, it was called Orlyk (Орлик)

In the 17th century Holta was part of Zaporizhian Sich, Bohopil was the customs point of the Polish–Lithuanian Commonwealth and Olviopol was part of the Russian Empire.

World War II
In World War II, Pervomaisk was occupied by the Axis Powers in 1941 and was divided between German occupation authorities on the east bank (Bohopol and Olviopol) and the Romanian-occupied region of Transnistria to the west (Holta).  Holta served as the center of the Golta judeţ (district) of Transnistria.  Pervomaisk had been more than 1/3 Jewish before the war but most were murdered during the occupation.

Current history and Russo-Ukrainian War
Had the Russian-held Mykolaiv Military–Civilian Administration pushed northwards capturing Nova Odesa, Voznesensk and Yuzhnoukrainsk, Pervomaisk will be the de jure capital of the oblast.

Climate

Notable residents
Selig Brodetsky (1888–1954), British mathematician, President of the Hebrew University of Jerusalem
Edgar de Wahl (1867–1948), Baltic German teacher, mathematician and linguist, creator of Interlingue

Remarkable buildings and structures
In Pervomaisk, there is at 48°4'0"N 30°51'29"E a 196 metres tall guyed TV mast, equipped with 6 crossbars running from the mast body to the guys.

Pervomaisk was the former location of the 46th Rocket Division of the 43rd Rocket Army of the Soviet Strategic Rocket Forces, formed during the Cold War. One of the commanders of the division, appointed in 1991, was General Major Mikhail Filatov. The RT-23UTTKh intercontinental ballistic missile silos based at Pervomaisk were destroyed, partially with Nunn–Lugar Cooperative Threat Reduction programme funding, during the 1990s.

Gallery

See also 
 Lysa Hora

References

External links
Official website of Pervomaisk 

 
Cities in Mykolaiv Oblast
Cities of regional significance in Ukraine
Populated places on the Southern Bug
Populated places established in the Ukrainian Soviet Socialist Republic
Populated places established in 1919
Yelisavetgradsky Uyezd
Soviet toponymy in Ukraine
Holocaust locations in Ukraine